Paljassaare (Estonian for "Bare Island") is the name of the Paljassaare Peninsula in the Tallinn Bay, and the name of a subdistrict in the district of Põhja-Tallinn (Northern Tallinn) in the city of Tallinn, the capital of Estonia. The subdistrict is located on the peninsula.

Paljassaare has a population of 583.

Paljassaare Harbour
The Paljassaare Harbour is a cargo port, which primarily specialises in handling mixed cargo, coal and oil products, as well as timber and perishables. The harbour is also used by the neighbouring refinery for cooking oil shipments.

The harbour has an area of 43.6 ha and has 11 berths.

Vessels enter and leave the harbour through a canal, which is 800 metres long, 90-150 metres wide, and 9.0 metres deep.

Terminals of Paljassaare Harbour
oil terminal
cooking oil terminal
timber terminal
coal terminal
general cargo terminals (including a reefer terminal)
dry bulk terminal

Gallery

References

External links

Paljassaaare Fish-processing Industry Ltd
Paljassaare Harbour
Paljassaare RockFest 
Paljassaare Harbour

Subdistricts of Tallinn
Peninsulas of Estonia
Former islands of Estonia